Slavomír is a Czech and a Slovak masculine given name. It may refer to:

 Slavomir of Moravia, medieval duke
 Slavomír Bališ, Slovak football player
 Slavomír Bartoň, Czech ice hockey player
 Slavomír Kňazovický, Slovak sprint canoeist
 Slavomír Kica, Slovak football player
 Slavomír Pavličko, Slovak ice hockey player
 Jan Slavomír Tomíček, Czech writer

See also
 Sławomir
 Slavomir

Slavic masculine given names
Czech masculine given names
Slovak masculine given names